Accused is a 1925 American silent drama film directed by Dell Henderson and starring Marcella Daly, Eric Mayne, and Charles Delaney.

Plot
As described in a film magazine review, Helen, reared as the daughter of the kindly Cyrus Braidwood, discovers that her real father is the crook Lait Rodman, overwhom Braidwood holds a confession of complicity in the death of his wife. Rodman obtains possession of the incriminating document. Helen secretly enters Rodman's apartment to search for the vanished paper and encounters Steve Randall, a wealthy young bachelor. Each takes the other as being a crook. They become trapped in the thieves' underground den which becomes flooded, and they barely escape. Matters are finally adjusted and the two agree to wed.

Cast

Preservation
A complete copy of Accused is held by the Library of Congress.

References

Bibliography
 Connelly, Robert B. The Silents: Silent Feature Films, 1910-36, Volume 40, Issue 2. December Press, 1998.
 Munden, Kenneth White. The American Film Institute Catalog of Motion Pictures Produced in the United States, Part 1. University of California Press, 1997.

External links
 

1925 films
1925 drama films
1920s English-language films
American silent feature films
Silent American drama films
American black-and-white films
Films directed by Dell Henderson
1920s American films